In computing, a distributed cache is an extension of the traditional concept of cache used in a single locale. A distributed cache may span multiple servers so that it can grow in size and in transactional capacity. It is mainly used to store application data residing in database and web session data. The idea of distributed caching has become feasible now because main memory has become very cheap and network cards have become very fast, with 1 Gbit now standard everywhere and 10 Gbit gaining traction. Also, a distributed cache works well on lower cost machines usually employed for web servers as opposed to database servers which require expensive hardware.
An emerging internet architecture known as Information-centric networking (ICN) is one of the best examples of a distributed cache network. The ICN is a network level solution hence the existing distributed network cache management schemes are not well suited for ICN. In the supercomputer environment, distributed cache is typically implemented in the form of burst buffer.

Examples 
 Aerospike
 Apache Ignite
 Couchbase
 Ehcache
 GigaSpaces
 Hazelcast
 Infinispan
 Memcached
 Oracle Coherence
 Riak
 Redis
 SafePeak
 Tarantool
 Velocity/AppFabric

See also 
 Cache algorithms
 Cache coherence
 Cache-oblivious algorithm
 Cache stampede
 Cache language model
 Database cache
 Cache manifest in HTML5

References 

Cache (computing)
Distributed computing